A benefit dependency network (BDN) is a diagram of cause and effect relationships.  It is drawn according to a specific structure that visualizes multiple cause-effect relationships organized into capabilities, changes and benefits.  It can be considered a business-oriented method of what engineers would call goal modeling and is usually read from right to left to provide a one-page overview of how a business generates value, starting with the high level drivers for change, such as found with Digital Initiatives or cross-organizational ERP management. First proposed by Cranfield School of Management as part of a Benefits Management approach  the original model has developed to encompass all the domains required for Benefits Management  namely Why, What, Who and How.  Recent development has added weights to the connections to create a weighted graph so that causal analysis, sometimes referred to as causality, is possible on the represented value chains so different strategies can be compared according to value and outcome. These chains provide a way to construct a compelling story or message that shows how the benefits proposed can be realized from the changes being considered. In software engineering, Jabbari et al. report the use of BDN for the purpose of software process improvement. They use BDN to structure the results of a systematic review on DevOps.

References

Value (ethics)
Causality
Information technology management